FUJIFILM Diosynth Biotechnologies, abbreviated FDB and also referred to simply as Diosynth, is a biopharmaceutical contract manufacturing organization that develops manufacturing processes and manufactures active ingredients and provides fill and finish services for pharmaceutical companies. FUJIFILM Diosynth Biotechnologies is the world's second largest contract manufacturer of biopharmaceuticals, with manufacturing facilities in Morrisville, North Carolina and College Station, Texas in the United States, Teesside, United Kingdom and Hillerød, Denmark in Europe, and recently added sites in Thousand Oaks, California and Watertown, Massachusetts. FUJIFILM Diosynth Biotechnologies operates a highly automated multipurpose manufacturing facility in College Station, Texas under the federal government's Center for Innovation in Advanced Development and Manufacturing (CIADM) program, which is the largest scale-out cell culture manufacturing facility in the United States.

In March 2021, the company announced that it had selected Holly Springs, North Carolina, located near its existing operations in Morrisville, for a $2 billion investment to establish a new large-scale cell culture production site, which is expected to be operational in 2025 and create 725 new jobs by the end of 2028. The company plans to install 8 x 20,000L bioreactors at the facility and plan for the ability to add an additional 24 x 20,000L bioreactors, as well as production lines for large scale automated fill and finish, labeling, and packaging services.

History

Early history 
The company started in Oss, Netherlands in 1923 with the extraction of insulin from bovine pancreata, and porcine insulin extraction in 1930. In January 2005, the company became a part of Organon, one of its sister companies in the Akzo Nobel pharma group. Along with its sister companies Organon and Intervet were sold to Schering-Plough in March 2007 by Akzo Nobel.  Following the mergers of Schering-Plough with Merck & Co. (MSD) on March 9, 2009, the company temporarily became part of the MSD Nutritionals products company, belonging to the MSD group.

In April 2011, the company was sold to Fujifilm, forming Fujifilm Diosynth Biotechnologies. For most of the company's history, Diosynth manufactured biochemical substances and fine chemicals, with pharmaceutical raw materials coming largely from either animal origin or chemical intermediates. Under Fujifilm, it no longer focuses on small molecules, but instead develops processes for and mass manufactures biologics (e.g., proteins and mRNA). On December 18, 2014, Fujifilm Diosynth Biotechnologies acquired Kalon Biotherapeutic Technologies in College Station, TX, which became Fujifilm Diosynth Biotechnologies Texas.

In March 2020, Fujifilm Diosynth Biotechnologies named Martin Meeson the company's new CEO. He will be taking over from Steve Bagshaw who is set to retire and become a non-executive chairman.

Subject to regulatory approval, at least 60 million doses of the Novavax COVID-19 vaccine will be manufactured for the UK government from 2021 by Fujifilm Diosynth Biotechnologies at its Billingham site.

References

Schering-Plough
Companies based in New Jersey
Companies based in North Brabant
Oss